Zhang Yuhan (born 6 January 1995) is a Chinese competitive swimmer who specializes in freestyle.

Career
At the 2015 World Aquatics Championships in Kazan, she won a bronze medal in the 4×200 m freestyle relay for swimming in the heats.

Zhang won the gold medal in the 400 meter freestyle at the 2014 Asian Games in Incheon, South Korea.

She qualified for the 2016 Summer Olympics in Rio de Janeiro in the 400 meter and 800 meter freestyle events. She swam the 9th time in the heats of the 400 meter and did not reach the final.

References

1995 births
Living people
Chinese female freestyle swimmers
Olympic swimmers of China
Swimmers at the 2016 Summer Olympics
World Aquatics Championships medalists in swimming
Asian Games medalists in swimming
Swimmers at the 2014 Asian Games
Swimmers at the 2018 Asian Games
Asian Games gold medalists for China
Medalists at the 2014 Asian Games
Medalists at the 2018 Asian Games